Jeremiah Francis Donovan (September 3, 1876 - June 27, 1938) was a Major League Baseball catcher. His brother, Tom Donovan, was a major league outfielder. He batted and threw right. He died in St. Petersburg, Florida and is buried in Saint Mary's Cemetery in Lock Haven, Pennsylvania.

References

Sources

Death and player information from Baseball-Reference

Major League Baseball catchers
Philadelphia Phillies players
Williamsport Millionaires players
Lynn Shoemakers players
Providence Grays (minor league) players
Brockton Tigers players
Baseball players from Pennsylvania
1876 births
1938 deaths
People from Lock Haven, Pennsylvania